Kahalli is a small village in Mysore district of Karnataka state, India.

Location
Kahalli is located on the road from Nanjangud to T. Narasipura town.

Administration
Kahalli has its own village government called Panchayath.  It comes under Nanjangud taluk.

Access
Kahalli is 25 km from Mysore, 160 km from Bangalore and 10 km from Nanjangud. Kahalli can be reached from Sujathapuram railway station or Mysore Junction Railway Station.

Demographics
The total area of the village is 137 hectares.  The population is 508 people in 124 houses.

Schools
 Government LP School, Kahalli.
 Morarji Desai Residential SChool, Nanjangud
 Citizen Public School, Nanjangud
 Samudhra Public School, Nanjangud. 
 Morarji School, Mahadevanagara.

Post Office
There is a post office in the village and the postal code is 571443.

See also
 Jeemaralli
 Sutturu
 Nagarle
Alambur

References

Villages in Mysore district